The Turkish Airlines World Golf Final was a golf tournament that was played on the 9–12 October 2012 in Turkey. This tournament took place at the Antalya Golf Club, Sultan course, in Belek, on the Turkish Riviera. It featured four of the five top ranked players: Rory McIlroy, Tiger Woods, Lee Westwood and Justin Rose in an eight-player field. They competed for a first prize of $1.5 million from a total purse of $5.2 million.

The tournament was an unofficial money event as it was not sanctioned by any tour. It was only staged once in 2012. It was replaced by the Turkish Airlines Open in 2013 which was part of the European Tour.

Because the event conflicted with the PGA Tour's Frys.com Open, all eight players had to be granted releases by the PGA Tour, in exchange for which they agreed to play the Frys.com Open at least once in the next three years.

Format
The format of the competition was medal match play, with the eight players divided into two pools of four. After round-robin play in each pool, the top two players in each pool advanced to the semi-finals, with the winners meeting in the final.

Participants

Pool play

Round 1

Round 2

Round 3

Standings
Pool A

Pool B

Source

Finals

Source

Prize money

References

External links

Golf tournaments in Turkey
Sport in Antalya